In philosophy, the brain in a vat (BIV) is a scenario used in a variety of thought experiments intended to draw out certain features of human conceptions of knowledge, reality, truth, mind, consciousness, and meaning. It is a modern incarnation of René Descartes's evil demon thought experiment, originated by Gilbert Harman. Found in many science fiction stories, it outlines a scenario in which a mad scientist, machine, or other entity might remove a person's brain from the body, suspend it in a vat of life-sustaining liquid, and connect its neurons by wires to a supercomputer that would provide it with electrical impulses identical to those a brain normally receives. According to such stories, the computer would then be simulating reality (including appropriate responses to the brain's own output) and the "disembodied" brain would continue to have perfectly normal conscious experiences, such as those of a person with an embodied brain, without these being related to objects or events in the real world.

Uses 
The simplest use of brain-in-a-vat scenarios is as an argument for philosophical skepticism and solipsism. A simple version of this runs as follows: since the brain in a vat gives and receives exactly the same impulses as it would if it were in a skull, and since these are its only way of interacting with its environment, then it is not possible to tell, from the perspective of that brain, whether it is in a skull or a vat. Yet in the first case, most of the person's beliefs may be true (if they believe, say, that they are walking down the street, or eating ice-cream); in the latter case, their beliefs are false. Since the argument says if one cannot know whether one is a brain in a vat, then one cannot know whether most of one's beliefs might be completely false. Since, in principle, it is impossible to rule out oneself being a brain in a vat, there cannot be good grounds for believing any of the things one believes; a skeptical argument would contend that one certainly cannot know them, raising issues with the definition of knowledge. Other philosophers have drawn upon sensation and its relationship to meaning in order to question whether brains in vats are really deceived at all, thus raising wider questions concerning perception, metaphysics, and the philosophy of language.

The brain-in-a-vat is a contemporary version of the argument given in Hindu Maya illusion, Plato's Allegory of the Cave, Zhuangzi's "Zhuangzi dreamed he was a butterfly", and the evil demon in René Descartes' Meditations on First Philosophy.

Recently, many contemporary philosophers believe that virtual reality will seriously affect human autonomy as a form of brain in a vat. But another view is that VR will not destroy our cognitive structure or take away our connection with reality. On the contrary, VR will allow us to have more new propositions, new insights and new perspectives to see the world.

Philosophical debates 
While the disembodied brain (the brain in a vat) can be seen as a helpful thought experiment, there are several philosophical debates surrounding the plausibility of the thought experiment. If these debates conclude that the thought experiment is implausible, a possible consequence would be that we are no closer to knowledge, truth, consciousness, representation, etc. than we were prior to the experiment.

Argument from biology 

One argument against the BIV thought experiment derives from the idea that the BIV is not – and cannot be – biologically similar to that of an embodied brain (that is, a brain found in a person). Since the BIV is dis embodied, it follows that it does not have similar biology to that of an embodied brain. That is, the BIV lacks the connections from the body to the brain, which renders the BIV neither neuroanatomically nor neurophysiologically similar to that of an embodied brain. If this is the case, we cannot say that it is even possible for the BIV to have similar experiences to the embodied brain, since the brains are not equal. However, it could be counter-argued that the hypothetical machine could be made to also replicate those types of inputs.

Argument from externalism 
A second argument deals directly with the stimuli coming into the brain. This is often referred to as the account from externalism or ultra-externalism. In the BIV, the brain receives stimuli from a machine. In an embodied brain, however, the brain receives the stimuli from the sensors found in the body (via touching, tasting, smelling, etc.) which receive their input from the external environment. This argument oftentimes leads to the conclusion that there is a difference between what the BIV is representing and what the embodied brain is representing. This debate has been hashed out, but remains unresolved, by several philosophers including Uriah Kriegel, Colin McGinn, and Robert D. Rupert, and has ramifications for philosophy of mind discussions on (but not limited to) representation, consciousness, content, cognition, and embodied cognition.

Argument from incoherence 
A third argument against BIV comes from a direction of incoherence, which was presented by the philosopher Hilary Putnam. He attempts to demonstrate this through the usage of a transcendental argument, in which he tries to illustrate that the thought experiment's incoherence lies on the basis that it is self-refuting. To do this, Putnam first established a relationship that he refers to as a "causal connection" which is sometimes referred to as "a causal constraint". This relationship is further defined, through a theory of reference that suggested reference can not be assumed, and words are not automatically intrinsically connected with what it represents. This theory of reference would later become known as semantic externalism. This concept is further illustrated when Putnam establishes a scenario in which a monkey types out Hamlet by chance; however, this does not mean that the monkey is referring to the play due to the fact that the monkey has no knowledge of Hamlet and therefore can not refer back to it. He then offers the "Twin Earth" example to demonstrate that two identical individuals, one on the Earth and another on a "twin Earth", may possess the exact same mental state and thoughts, yet refer to two different things. For instance, when people think of cats, the referent of their thoughts would be the cats that are found on Earth. However, people's twins on twin Earth, though possessing the same thoughts, would instead be referring not to Earth's cats, but to twin Earth's cats. Bearing this in mind, he writes that a "pure" brain in a vat, i.e., one that has never existed outside of the simulation, could not even truthfully say that it was a brain in a vat. This is because the BIV, when it says "brain" and "vat", can only refer to objects within the simulation, not to things outside the simulation it does not have a relationship with. Putnam refers to this relationship as a "causal connection" which is sometimes referred to as "a causal constraint". Therefore, what it says is demonstrably false. Alternatively, if the speaker is not actually a BIV, then the statement is also false. He concludes, then, that the statement "I'm a BIV" is necessarily false and self-refuting. This argument has been explored at length in philosophical literature since its publication. One counter-argument says that, even assuming Putnam's reference theory, a brain on Earth that is "kidnapped", placed into a vat, and subjected to a simulation could still refer to "real" brains and vats, and thus correctly say it is a brain in a vat. However, the notion that the "pure" BIV is incorrect and the reference theory underpinning it remains influential in the philosophy of mind, language and metaphysics.

Reconstructions of Putnam's argument 
An issue that has arisen with Putnam's argument is that even if the premises he laid out is assumed to be true, the only proven fact is that when a brain in a vat states 'I am a BIV' it would be false due to the causal theory of reference. This does not necessarily provide proof that we are not brains in vats, rather it is an argument that is primarily focused on externalist semantics. In order to combat this issue, various philosophers have taken on the task of reconstructing Putnam's argument. Some philosophers like Anthony L. Brueckner and Crispin Wright have taken on approaches that utilize disquotational principles. While others like Ted A. Warfield have taken on approaches that focus on the concepts of self-knowledge and priori.

The Disjunctive Argument 
One of the earliest but influential reconstructions of Putnam's transcendental argument was suggested by Anthony L. Brueckner. Brueckner's reconstruction is as follows: "(1) Either I am a BIV (speaking vat-English) or I am a non-BIV (speak- ing English). (2) If I am a BIV (speaking vat-English), then my utterances of 'I am a BIV' are true if I have sense impressions as of being a BIV. (3) If I am a BIV (speaking vat-English), then I do not have sense impressions as of being a BIV. (4) If I am a BIV (speaking vat-English), then my utterances of 'I am a BIV' are false. [(2), (3)] (5) If I am a non-BIV (speaking English), then my utterances of 'I am a BIV' are true if I am a BIV. (6) If I am a non-BIV (speaking English), then my utterances of 'I am a BIV' are false. [(5)] (7) My utterances of 'I am a BIV' are false. [(1), (4), (6)]" A key thing to note is that although these premises further define Putnam's argument, it does not in fact prove ' I am not a BIV', due to the fact that although the premises do lay out the idea that 'I am a BIV' is false, it does not necessarily provide any basis on which false statement the speaker is making. There is no differentiation between the BIV making the statement versus a non-BIV making the statement. Therefore, Brueckner further strengthens his argument by adding a disquotational principle of "My utterances of ‘I am not a BIV’ are true if I am not a BIV."

In fiction 

Agents of S.H.I.E.L.D., Season 4
Alita: Battle Angel
Avatar
Bliss
"The Brain of Colonel Barham", a 1965 episode of the TV series The Outer Limits
The Brain of Morbius
Brain (novel)
Brainstorm
Caprica
Chappie
The City of Lost Children
Cold Lazarus
The Colossus of New York
Dark Star
Donovan's Brain
Existenz
Fallout series
 Point Lookout, an expansion pack for Fallout 3
 Old World Blues, an expansion pack for Fallout: New Vegas
 Automatron, an expansion pack for Fallout 4
Futurama
Gangers in Doctor Who
Ghost in the Shell
Inception

Lobotomy Corporation
"Flashes Before Your Eyes", an episode of Lost
The Man with Two Brains
The Matrix film series
"Out of Time", an episode of Red Dwarf
Possible Worlds
Psycho-Pass
Repo Men
RoboCop
Saints Row IV
"Ship in a Bottle", an episode of Star Trek: The Next Generation
Sid Meier's Alpha Centauri
Soma
Source Code
"Spock's Brain", an episode of Star Trek: The Original Series
The Star Diaries
Strange Days
"The Inner Light", an episode of Star Trek: The Next Generation
The Thirteenth Floor
Total Recall
Transcendence
Tron
Tron: Legacy
"The Vacation Goo", an episode of American Dad!
The Whisperer in Darkness
Upload (TV series)
Where am I?, written by Daniel Dennett
William and Mary by Roald Dahl
 Adapted into the first episode of Way Out in 1961
 Adapted again for Tales of the Unexpected in 1979
"White Christmas - Part II", an episode of Black Mirror
World on a Wire

See also 

 Dream argument
 Evil demon
 Experience machine
 Floating man (Avicenna thought experiment)
 Human Brain Project
 Internalism and externalism
 Isolated brain
 Mind uploading
 Neurally controlled animat
 Simulation hypothesis
 Skeptical hypothesis
 Technological singularity
 Transhumanism
 Red pill

References

External links

Philosophy
 
 
 Inverse "brain in a vat"
 Putnam's discussion of the "brains in a vat" in chapter one of 
 'Where Am I?' by Daniel Dennett
 "Brain in a Vat Brain Teaser" – Harper's Magazine (1996)
Science
 Adaptive flight control with living neuronal networks on microelectrode arrays
 Architecture for Neuronal Cell Control of a Mobile Robot

Hypothetical technology
Science fiction themes
Thought experiments in philosophy